Rachel Furness (born 19 June 1988) is a professional footballer who plays for FA Women's Championship club Bristol City. She also represented the Northern Ireland national team. A powerful central midfielder, she featured as a winger or striker earlier in her career. Furness' ex-manager at Sunderland, Mick Mulhern, described her as "a strong and determined player."

Club career

Early career
Furness attended Usworth Comprehensive School and represented Durham at County level. By season 2002–03 she was already playing for Chester-le-Street Ladies, alongside several other youngsters and former England striker Aran Embleton.

Senior career
In 2004 Furness moved to Gateshead College to study sports development and fitness. She began playing for the women's football academy at the college and Sunderland. Jill Scott was a teammate in both sides.

In 2006 Furness moved to Northumbria University to study sports development with coaching, and swapped Sunderland for Newcastle United. However, she had by then suffered a serious knee injury, which required two operations and the removal of most of the cartilage. Doctors advised Furness to stop playing football but she nevertheless resumed playing for Newcastle United.

In December 2009, Furness scored one and made the other for Mel Reay, as Newcastle drew 2–2 at OOH Lincoln Ladies in the FA Women's Cup, only to miss her penalty in the shootout defeat.

Furness spent the 2010 summer season in Iceland with Grindavik, then rejoined Sunderland – making her second debut for the club in a 4–0 Premier League Cup win over Newcastle in October 2010. After helping Sunderland win the Premier League title, Furness joined FA WSL club Lincoln Ladies on loan. She made a quick debut in Lincoln's 1–0 home defeat to Chelsea in May, the last game before the WSL mid–season break. She returned to parent club Sunderland before the WSL restarted in July.

In January 2017, Furness left Sunderland for Reading shortly after the Lady Black Cats reverted to part-time status.

Furness joined Tottenham Hotspur on a season-long loan from Reading on 6 September 2019. On 28 December 2019, Furness joined Liverpool, after being recalled by Reading.

International career
Chester-le-Street director of coaching Bill Godward alerted the Football Association to Furness' potential at an early stage. However, she was overlooked by England because she was not attached to a club with a centre of excellence or academy. Furness then accepted a call-up from Northern Ireland, and represented them in an U17 tournament in Spring 2004. Although born and raised in Tyne and Wear, Furness was eligible for Northern Ireland as her mother was born in Belfast.

After representing her adopted homeland at U17 and U19 level, Furness progressed to the senior international team. In November 2005 she scored against Slovakia, in Northern Ireland's first competitive home match for 20 years. Following a two-year absence from the national team caused by injury, Furness returned in time for the 2011 World Cup Qualifying campaign.

She contributed four goals, including a hat-trick against Croatia, as Northern Ireland ultimately finished third in their group behind France and Finland. In November 2011 Furness scored in Northern Ireland's shock 3–1 Euro 2013 qualifying win over former World and Olympic champions Norway.

Furness also represented Irish Universities at the World University Games, playing in the 2009 tournament in Belgrade. Two years later she was named in the Great Britain Universities squad for the event in Shenzhen.

The 2021 UEFA Women's European Championships Qualification saw record-breaking success for the Northern Ireland Women's National Team, and Furness played a key part in the squad. Several goals by Furness throughout normal qualification helped NI reach their first ever play-offs for a major tournament, a record in itself. This included the winning goal in a game away to Belarus , all the more vital given that NI had their keeper sent off within the first 30 minutes of the game.

There was little expection that the squad would overcome this final obstacle to reach the tournament, given the higher-ranking opposition. In the first leg, away to Ukraine, Furness scored a vital goal to help NI to a truly surprise 2-1 victory. In the second leg, at home, Furness again made the starting team, but was forced off after an injury. The team won, securing their place in the 2022 tournament.

In November 2021, in back-to-back FIFA Women's World Cup qualifiers against North Macedonia, Furness scored historic goals to equal, then break, the Northern Ireland goalscoring record. In the first game, away, Furness notched a hatrick to equal the record. Then in the home fixture, she scored twice to take the record outright, overtaking the record of 36 goals for Northern Ireland, formerly held by David Healy.

In December 2021, Furness was awarded the NI BBC Sports Personality of the Year 2021 for her contribution to the national team's historic year .

In June 2022, Furness was named in the Northern Ireland squad for UEFA Women's Euro 2022,. although the tournament ended unsuccessfully for her team as they finished bottom of Group A.

On 18 August 2022, Furness announced via social media that she was making herself unavailable for international selection for the foreseeable future for personal reasons, though she insisted she was not retiring altogether.

International goals
Scores and results list Northern Ireland's goal tally first.

References

External links
IFA bio of Rachel Furness
UEFA bio of Rachel Furness
 

Living people
1988 births
Footballers from Newcastle upon Tyne
Expatriate women's footballers in Iceland
Sunderland A.F.C. Ladies players
Notts County L.F.C. players
Women's Super League players
FA Women's National League players
Northern Ireland women's international footballers
Women's association footballers from Northern Ireland
English women's footballers
English people of Northern Ireland descent
Women's association football midfielders
Newcastle United W.F.C. players
Reading F.C. Women players
Rachel Furness
Tottenham Hotspur F.C. Women players
Liverpool F.C. Women players
Bristol City W.F.C. players
UEFA Women's Euro 2022 players